Tori and Lokita, is a 2022 Belgian-French drama film written, directed and produced by Jean-Pierre and Luc Dardenne. The film premiered at the 2022 Cannes Film Festival on 24 May 2022, where it competed for the Palme d'Or and won the festival's special 75th Anniversary Award.

Plot
Two African immigrants, eleven-year-old Tori and sixteen-year-old Lokita, live by their wits in a Belgian city, posing as brother and sister.

The two hang out at the restaurant of Betim, a man who uses his business to cover up a drug ring they courier, and sometimes pays Lokita for sexual favors. Lokita is trying to obtain a work visa with which she could support her and Tori, but she also has to deal with the debt contracted with the people who brought her in Belgium and also think about the mother and five brothers she left behind in Cameroon.

When Lokita's papers are rejected again, she accepts Betim's offer to go to work for a while, locked up in a hangar tending cannabis plantations. But she has to be separated from Tori, without even being able to call him, which is unbearable for both of them.

Tori hides in Betim's car to find out where Lokita is, then he manages to find a way into the hangar. But on his second visit, they are both discovered by Betim. They flee, followed by Betim and his aide Luckas, who kills Lokita with two gunshots to the head, but cannot find Tori, who has remained hidden in the bushes.

The film ends with Lokita's funeral.

Cast
 Pablo Schils as Tori
 Mbundu Joely as Lokita
 Charlotte De Bruyne as Margot
 Tijmen Govaerts as Luckas
 Alban Ukaj as Betim
 Marc Zinga as Firmin

Reception
Tori and Lokita received generally positive reviews from critics. Rotten Tomatoes gives the film a score of 89% based on 46 reviews, with a weighted average of 7.20/10. The site's critical consensus states: "Another humanistic gem from the Dardennes, Tori and Lokita puts its characters in heartbreaking circumstances while insisting on their intrinsic dignity." 

Metacritic gave the film a rating of 75/100, based on 13 reviews, indicating "generally favorable reviews".

Release
Tori and Lokita was the closing film of the 46th Hong Kong International Film Festival, where it was screened on 31 August 2022.

The film was released in theaters in Belgium on 7 September 2022 by Cinéart, and in France on 5 October 2022 by Diaphana Distribution.

In June 2022, Sideshow and Janus Films acquired North American distribution rights for the film.

Awards and nominations

References

External links
 

2022 drama films
2022 films
Belgian drama films
French drama films
2020s French films
Films directed by the Dardenne brothers
Films set in Belgium
Films shot in Belgium
2020s French-language films
2022 independent films
Films about social issues
Films about refugees
Films about friendship
Films about immigration
Films about immigration to Europe